Pseudopanthera is a genus of moths in the family Geometridae erected by Jacob Hübner in 1823.

Species
 Pseudopanthera macularia (Linnaeus, 1758)
 Pseudopanthera ennomosaria (Walker, 1862)

References

Ourapterygini
Taxa named by Jacob Hübner